The albums discography of American singer-songwriter Janet Jackson consists of ten studio albums, two compilation albums, and two remix albums. When she was sixteen, her father arranged a contract for her with A&M Records. Her debut album, Janet Jackson (1982), peaked at number 64 on the US Billboard 200 chart and sold 250,000 copies in the US. Her next album, Dream Street (1984), peaked at number 147 on the Billboard 200, a weaker effort than her previous album. Her third album, Control (1986), which became known as her breakthrough album, topped the Billboard 200 and sold over 10 million copies worldwide. Her fourth album, Janet Jackson's Rhythm Nation 1814 (1989), topped the Billboard 200 for four consecutive weeks and sold three million copies within the first four months of its release. The album went on to produce seven consecutive top 5 hits, four of them reaching the top spot on the Billboard Hot 100 in three separate calendar years, A record yet to be broken. The album was certified 6× Platinum by RIAA, and sold over 12 million copies worldwide.

After being approached personally by Virgin Records owner Richard Branson, and signing the  multi-million dollar contract with the label, she released her fifth studio album Janet (1993). The album debuted at number one on the Billboard 200 with the largest first-week sales in history for a female artist at the time. It became Jackson's third consecutive album to top the chart, as well as reaching the number one position in Australia, New Zealand and the UK. Certified 6× platinum by the RIAA, it sold over 14 million copies. In 1995 Jackson released her first compilation album Design of a Decade 1986/1996. It was certified Double Platinum by the RIAA and has since sold 10 million copies worldwide. In 1997 Jackson received an $80 million dollar contract, making her the world's highest paid musical act for the second time in her career. Following the contract was her sixth album The Velvet Rope, The album produced one of the biggest hits of her career "Together Again". It was certified 3× Platinum and sold over 10 million copies worldwide.

In 2001 Jackson released her seventh album All for You. The album debuted at number one on the US Billboard 200, and Top R&B/Hip-Hop Albums chart, selling 605,128 copies in its first week. It was Jackson's fifth straight number one debut in the United States, and the biggest opening week sales of her career. It went on being certified 2× Platinum by RIAA and selling over 7 million copies worldwide. In 2004 Jackson released her next album Damita Jo. The album debuted at number two on the Billboard 200 with first-week sales of 381,000 copies. It was Jacksons weakest effort since Dream Street believed to be due to blacklisting by MTV and radio stations due to the Super Bowl XXXVIII halftime show controversy. Despite weaker sales then her previous efforts, the album was certified platinum by RIAA with an estimate of 3 million copies worldwide. In 2006 Jackson released her ninth studio album 20 Y.O. The album debuted at number two on the Billboard 200 with 297,000 copies sold in its first week, making it Jackson's eighth consecutive top three debut and second consecutive number two album debut. It is also Jackson's eighth consecutive platinum album, it went on selling 1.2 milion copies worldwide. In 2008 Jackson released her tenth studio album Discipline. The album debuted at number one on the Billboard 200 with 181,000 copies sold. And has since sold over 600,000 copies. 

Jackson is listed as the eleventh best-selling female recording artist in the US. She has attained 5 consecutive Top Billboard Albums and 7 overall.  
She has 40 million certified albums and singles in the United States according to the RIAA, Overall she has sold over 100 million, which makes her one of the best-selling music artists.

Studio albums

Remix albums

Compilations

See also
 Janet Jackson singles discography
 Janet Jackson videography
 List of awards and nominations received by Janet Jackson
 List of best-selling music artists
 List of best-selling albums by women
 List of number-one hits (United States)
 List of artists who reached number one on the Hot 100 (U.S.)
 List of number-one dance hits (United States)
 List of artists who reached number one on the U.S. Dance chart

Notes

References

External links
 
 
 
 

Discography
Discographies of American artists
Pop music discographies
Rhythm and blues discographies